Mark Brian McPeak (born 1968) is an Irish international lawn and indoor bowler born in Northern Ireland.

Bowls career 
He won a silver medal in the Men's triples at the 2006 Commonwealth Games in Thornbury, Victoria.

He is a three times National champion, winning the fours title with his club Belmont, at the Irish National Bowls Championships in 2000, 2003 and 2021. He was also the 2016 singles runner-up behind Barry Kane.

References

Male lawn bowls players from Northern Ireland
1968 births
Living people
Commonwealth Games medallists in lawn bowls
Commonwealth Games silver medallists for Northern Ireland
Bowls players at the 2006 Commonwealth Games
Medallists at the 2006 Commonwealth Games